Syzygium tenuifolium is a species of plant in the family Myrtaceae. It is a tree endemic to Peninsular Malaysia. Under the synonym Pseudoeugenia tenuifolia, it was classed as endangered and threatened by habitat loss.

References

tenuifolia
Endemic flora of Peninsular Malaysia
Trees of Peninsular Malaysia
Endangered plants
Taxonomy articles created by Polbot
Taxobox binomials not recognized by IUCN